Kwaku Nuamah Oduroh (born 16 October 2002) is an English professional footballer who plays for Derby County, as a defender.

Career
Oduroh began his career at Manchester City, leaving the club in the summer of 2022 (after 14 years) and undergoing a trial at Derby County. He signed a two-year contract with Derby in July 2022.

He made his debut for Derby County in a Carabao Cup tie away to Mansfield Town on 9 August 2022.

Personal life
Oduroh is of Ghanaian descent.

References

2002 births
Living people
English footballers
English sportspeople of Ghanaian descent
Manchester City F.C. players
Derby County F.C. players
Association football defenders
Black British sportspeople